Fragilariforma is a genus of diatoms belonging to the family Fragilariaceae.

The genus was first described by D. M. Williams and Round in 1988.

The genus has cosmopolitan distribution.

Species:
 Fragilariforma bicapitata
 Fragilariforma neoproducta
 Fragilariforma virescens
 Fragilariforma virescens

References

Diatoms
Diatom genera